Slums of Berlin is a 1925 German silent drama film directed by Gerhard Lamprecht and starring Aud Egede-Nissen, Bernhard Goetzke, and Mady Christians. It was shot at the Marienfelde Studios in Berlin. The film's sets were designed by the art director Otto Moldenhauer. It was produced and distributed by National Film.

Synopsis
After taking the rap for a crime committed by his girlfriend, a man serves four years in prison. On his release he discovers she has since married a wealthy man, and that he is now ostracized by society including his own family. He sinks into a state of despair, until he is rescued and reformed by a sympathetic prostitute who helps him gain work at a factory.

Cast

References

Bibliography

External links

1925 films
1925 drama films
Films of the Weimar Republic
German drama films
German silent feature films
Films directed by Gerhard Lamprecht
Films set in Berlin
National Film films
German black-and-white films
Social realism in film
Silent drama films
Films shot at Terra Studios
1920s German films
1920s German-language films